The Towada class is a series of  replenishment oilers of the Japan Maritime Self-Defense Force. Three ships of the class were built between 1985 and 1989. The ships have the hull designator AOE.

The Towada class was designed as an enlarged, improved version of the Sagami-class fast combat support ships. The vessels are capable of mounting the Phalanx CIWS by design, although this is not a common occurrence.

List of ships

References

External links

 GlobalSecurity.org entry
GlobalSecurity.org Towada specifications

Auxiliary replenishment ship classes
Ships of the Japan Maritime Self-Defense Force
Ships built by Hitachi Zosen Corporation